Hacienda Kancabchén was a farm in the Halachó Municipality in the state of Yucatán, Mexico. It is one of the properties that arose during the nineteenth century henequen boom. There are numerous other properties of this name in the Yucatán including Hacienda Kancabchén in Baca, Hacienda Kancabchén (Homún), Hacienda Kancabchén (Motul), Hacienda Kankabchén (Seyé), Hacienda Kankabchén (Tixkokob), Hacienda Kancabchén (Tunkás), Hacienda Kancabchén Ucí and Hacienda Kancabchén de Valencia.

Toponymy
The name (Kancabchén) is a word from the Mayan language meaning the well of the red ground.

How to get there
Go 67.5 km southwest from the southern Periférico of Mérida on highway 180 to the town of Halachó. Enter the town on Calle 20 and at the intersection of Calle 20 and Calle 19 and turn right, heading west to Calle 26. Take Calle 26 northwest for approximately 8 km to Hacienda Kancabchén.

History

In 1970 the name changed from Kancabchén to Kankabchén. In 1990, it changed back to the prior spelling.

Demographics
All of the henequen plantations ceased to exist as autonomous communities with the agrarian land reform implemented by President Lazaro Cardenas in 1937. His decree turned the haciendas into collective ejidos, leaving only 150 hectares to the former landowners for use as private property. Figures before 1937 indicate populations living on the farm. After 1937, figures indicate those living in the community, as the remaining Hacienda Kancabchén houses only the owner's immediate family.

According to the 2005 census conducted by the INEGI, the population of the city was 421 inhabitants, of whom  217  were men and 204 were women.

References

Bibliography
 Bracamonte, P and Solís, R., Los espacios de autonomía maya, Ed. UADY, Mérida, 1997.
 Gobierno del Estado de Yucatán, "Los municipios de Yucatán", 1988.
 Kurjack, Edward y Silvia Garza, Atlas arqueológico del Estado de Yucatán, Ed. INAH, 1980.
 Patch, Robert, La formación de las estancias y haciendas en Yucatán durante la colonia, Ed. UADY, 1976.
 Peón Ancona, J. F., "Las antiguas haciendas de Yucatán", en Diario de Yucatán, Mérida, 1971.

Populated places in Yucatán
Haciendas of Yucatán
Agave production